Hidden Treasures Ruslan FM 95.2 Miss Nepal 2019, the 25th Silver Jubilee anniversary of Miss Nepal beauty pageant, which was held on 9 May 2019 at Laboratory H.S. premises, Kirtipur, Nepal .  During the coronation night, four major winners was crowned as Miss Universe Nepal 2019, Miss World Nepal 2019, Miss Earth Nepal 2019 and Miss International Nepal 2019. Miss Supranational Nepal was also added as a new title in this year's edition making Top 5 winners.

The Top 5 winners of 2018 crowned their successors: Miss Nepal Universe 2018 Manita Devkota crowned Pradeepta Adhikari as Miss Nepal Universe 2019, Miss Nepal World 2018 Shrinkhala Khatiwada crowned Anushka Shrestha as Miss Nepal World 2019, Miss Nepal Earth 2018 Priya Sigdel crowned Riya Basnet as Miss Nepal Earth 2019, Miss Nepal International 2018 Ronali Amatya crowned Meera Kakshapati as Miss Nepal International 2019 and Miss Nepal Supranational 2018 Mahima Singh crowned Rose Lama as Miss Nepal Supranational 2019.

In addition, the winners received Rs 100,000 as prize money for winning the title. The auditions of Miss Nepal were held from 13 to 24 March in Birtamode, Birgunj, Butwal, Chitwan, Dhangadhi, Dharan, Nepalgunj, Pokhara and Kathmandu. Regional pageants winners like Miss Pokhara; Miss Purwanchal, Miss Western Nepal and Miss Nepal Oceania 2018 (Anushka Shrestha) were directly qualified for Top 25 of the Miss Nepal 2019 along with one contestant from Livon Wild Card entry. Miss Hong Kong Nepal 2018 (Priya Gurung) was barred from participating due to the age limit

NTV and NTV PLUS broadcast the pageant live for the Nepalese at home and abroad.

Results

Placements
Color key

The Big 5 main titles were awarded in the following order:

Special Awards

Contestants

(●) The winner of NMag Miss Popular Choice (online voting) got direct entry in Top 15 Semi-Finalists.

Previous Experience

 (#) Anushka Shrestha is the winner of Miss Nepal Oceania 2018 and she got a direct entry to Miss Nepal 2019.
 (#) Sara Bajimaya is Miss Pokhara 2018 and got a direct entry to Miss Nepal 2019.
 (#) Pooja Shrestha is Miss Purwanchal 2018 and she got a direct entry to Miss Nepal 2019.
 (#) Shiwani Ghimire is the winner of Miss Western Nepal 2018 and she got a direct entry to Miss Nepal 2019.
 (#) Rose Lama was Miss Nepal California 2017.
 (#) Nisha Pathak is the Winner of the Pageant Miss Global International 2014, which was held in Kathmandu, Nepal. She also bagged the Miss Discipline title at the event. Besides, she represented Nepal at the Miss Heritage International 2015 pageant held in New Delhi, India. She was one of the top 5 winners at the event.

References

External links
Miss Nepal Website
Miss Nepal Official Website

Beauty pageants in Nepal
2019 beauty pageants
2019 in Nepal
Miss Nepal